Sokolsky District is an administrative district (raion), one of the forty in Nizhny Novgorod Oblast, Russia. As a municipal division, it is incorporated as Sokolsky Urban Okrug. It is located in the northwest of the oblast. Its administrative center is the urban locality (a work settlement) of Sokolskoye. Population: 14,139 (2010 Census);  The population of Sokolskoye accounts for 44.9% of the district's total population.

History
The district was a part of Ivanovo Oblast until 1994.

References

Notes

Sources

Districts of Nizhny Novgorod Oblast
 
